Ballafayle (Kerruish) Halt (Manx: Stadd Valley Fayle Kerruish) is an intermediate stopping point on the Manx Electric Railway on the Isle of Man. Like many such intermediate stopping points, it is not marked on most maps, nor is it shown on the railway timetable.

Location

It is at or near the easternmost point on the Manx Electric Railway, about 5 km SE of Ramsey. The area in which it is situated is home to two farms, which has led over time to there being two named stopping points on the railway, denoting each farmer's name. Ballafayle (Kerruish) was once at the farm of the island's Chairman of the Executive Council, Sir Charles Kerruish.

Also
Manx Electric Railway Stations

References

Sources
 Manx Manx Electric Railway Stopping Places (2002) Manx Electric Railway Society
 Island Island Images: Manx Electric Railway Pages (2003) Jon Wornham
 Official Tourist Department Page (2009) Isle Of Man Heritage Railways

Railway stations in the Isle of Man
Manx Electric Railway